This is a list of cathedrals in the state of California, United States:

See also
List of cathedrals in the United States

References

 California
Cathedrals in California
California
Cathedrals